Xijiao Airport may refer to:

Beijing Xijiao Airport, military airport in Beijing
Manzhouli Xijiao Airport, civil airport serving Manzhouli, Inner Mongolia